Ian Stuart Donaldson (11 August 1957 – 24 September 1993), also known as Ian Stuart, was an English neo-Nazi musician. He was best known as the front-man of Skrewdriver, a Punk band which, from 1982 onwards, he rebranded as a Rock Against Communism band. He raised money through nationalist concerts with his Blood & Honour network.

Biography
Born in Poulton-le-Fylde, Lancashire, Donaldson attended Baines School in nearby Poulton, where he met Sean McKay, Phil Walmsley, and John Grinton. They formed the cover band Tumbling Dice, who played songs by the Rolling Stones and other bands. In 1975, they formed Skrewdriver.

After the original Skrewdriver lineup disbanded in 1979, Donaldson formed a new lineup and began to write songs for youth and music in the National Front. The new version of Skrewdriver openly promoted far-right groups such as the National Front and raised funds for them (and affiliated organisations) through the White Noise Records label. Skrewdriver became known for its involvement in the White Nationalist movement and its associated music genre, Rock Against Communism. In 1987, Donaldson founded Blood & Honour, nationalist music and organised concerts.

Donaldson also became leader of two other bands—The Klansmen (a rockabilly band) and White Diamond (a hard rock/heavy metal band)—and released several solo albums. Along with Skrewdriver guitarist Stigger (Stephen Calladine), he recorded the albums Patriotic Ballads volumes 1 and 2, which included covers of folk songs such as "The Green Fields of France". Donaldson's voice also appeared in the song "The Invisible Empire".

On the night of 23 September 1993, Donaldson was involved in a car crash in Derbyshire that resulted in his death the following day, at the age of 36.

Discography

Ian Stuart & Rough Justice
Justice for the Cottbus Six (1992) (Rock-O-Rama)

Ian Stuart & Stigger
Patriotic Ballads (1991) (Rock-O-Rama)
Patriotic Ballads II – Our Time Will Come (1992) (Rock-O-Rama)

Skrewdriver
All Skrewed Up (1977) (Chiswick) (later re-issued as The Early Years w. extra tracks)
Peel Session (1977) BBC Radio 1
Back with a Bang (1982) (Rock-O-Rama)
The Voice of Britain (1983) (Rock-O-Rama)
Hail the New Dawn (1984) (Rock-O-Rama)
Blood & Honour (1985) (Rock-O-Rama)
White Rider (1987) (Rock-O-Rama)
After the Fire (1988) (Rock-O-Rama)
Warlord (1989) (Rock-O-Rama)
The Strong Survive (1990) (Rock-O-Rama)
Freedom What Freedom (1992) (Rock-O-Rama)
Hail Victory (1994) (ISD Records)

Solo albums
No Turning Back (1989) (Rock-O-Rama)
Slay The Beast (1990) (Rock-O-Rama)
Patriot (1991) (Rock-O-Rama)

The Klansmen
Fetch the Rope (LP, 1989 / Klan Records) (CD, 1991 / Rock-O-Rama Records)
Rebel with a Cause (LP, 1990 / Klan Records) (CD, 1991 / Rock-O-Rama Records)
Rock 'n' Roll Patriots (LP, 1991 / Klan Records) (CD. 1991 / Rock-O-Rama Records)
Single:
Johnny Joined the Klan (1989 / Klan Records) (3 Songs from the "Fetch the Rope" LP)

White Diamond
The Reaper (1991) (Rock-O-Rama)
The Power & The Glory (1992) (Glory Discs)

Further reading

The soundtrack of neo-fascism, Patterns of Prejudice (2013) 
 Mark Green "Ian Stuart Donaldson – Memories", PC Records (2007)
 Mark Green "Ian Stuart Donaldson – Rock 'n Roll Patriot", PC Records (2009)

References

1957 births
1993 deaths
English rock guitarists
English male singers
English neo-Nazis
People from Blackpool
People from Poulton-le-Fylde
Road incident deaths in England
English people of Scottish descent
20th-century English singers
20th-century British guitarists
20th-century British male singers